Tejal (Devanagari : तेजल) is an Indian feminine given name.

Notable people 
 Tejal Hasabnis (born 1997), Indian cricketer
 Tejal A. Desai (born 1972), American academic in the fields of physiology and nanotechnology
 Tejal Rao, British-American food culture writer for The New York Times
 Tejal Shah (born 1979), Indian visual artist, curator

Hindu given names
Indian feminine given names